Madonna studies (also called Madonna scholarship, Madonna-ology or Madonna Phenomenon) is the study of the work and life of American singer-songwriter Madonna using an interdisciplinary approach incorporating cultural studies and media studies. In a general sense, it could refer to any academic studies devoted to her. After Madonna's debut in 1983, the discipline did not take long to start up and the field appeared in the mid-1980s, achieving its peak in the next decade. Educator David Buckingham deemed her presence in academic circles as "a meteoric rise to academic canonisation". The rhetoric academic view of that time, majority in the sense of postmodernism, generally considered her as "the most significant artist of the late twentieth century" thus she is understood variously and as a vehicle to open up issues. In the 21st century, academic studies about Madonna have remained and continued in many aspects. At the height of its developments, authors of these academic writings were sometimes called "Madonna scholars" or "Madonnologists", and both E. Ann Kaplan and John Fiske were classified as precursors.

These studies analyzed several topics, but mostly Madonna studies involved in the study of gender, feminism, race, multiculturalism, sexuality, and the mass media. The wide-ranging resources used included, her films, songs, live performances, books, interviews or her videos. Both Madonna studies and its authors received a variety and a large amount of criticisms from academy and media outlets. It was also, however, defended in equal measure. The Madonna studies played a major role for the direction of the American cultural studies, and brought pop artists to the foreground of scholarly attention.

The vast academic literature on Madonna, from academic conferences to journals, courses, theses, books, seminars and textbooks made Madonna as ubiquitous in academic discourse as she was in the popular media. Also, Madonna's semiotic was diversified in virtually all theoretical stripe by her scholars, each of whom had their own take on her role in society. With all of this, Madonna became for a while, the most studied pop artist or female artiste figure in universities.

Terminology
The field is commonly called Madonna studies, and that phrase popped up in the late-1980s according to writer Maura Johnston. Although numerous academics like David Gauntlett used that term, scholars such as Janice Radway and Suzanna Danuta Walters to journalists like Maureen Orth have referred to them also as the Madonna-ology, or Madonnalogy. Another group of academics like E. Ann Kaplan called them the "Madonna Phenomenon" (MP), while others used the term Madonna scholarship.

The academic literature about Madonna, and its "own industry", was called as "the Madonna industry", "Madonna business" or the "Madonna boom" by a variety of scholars such as Simon Frith and Michael Bérubé or journalists like Jon Pareles. Critics like Robert Christgau called the "Madonnathinking" (Madonnathink) to commentaries about the singer, including the academic vein.

Origins and development

Background

Literary scholar Luis Cárcamo-Huechante from Harvard University puts the origins of the Madonna studies in the camp sensibility with the concept proposed in the 1960s by Susan Sontag, alluding to the "fascination of artifice and exaggeration" and what Madonna produced and put into circulation on an industrial and planetary scale. Associate professor Diane Pecknold in American Icons (2006) also mentioned the camp sensibility and added that for most of the twentieth century, American scholars subscribed to the idea of an objective and universal canon and academics were applying to Madonna the same sophisticated textual readings.

Chilean literary critic Óscar Contardo set its background with the British cultural studies when the phenomenon of celebrities began to be analyzed from the 1970s. American historian Richard Wolin, observed that the cultural studies approach blossomed during the 1980s, further adding that under Foucault's growing influence as well as that Stuart Hall and the Birmingham School, popular culture was viewed as a site of "resistance" to power. It was in this vein that "Madonna studies" blossomed into an academic cottage industry, Wolin said.

In Madonna: A Biography (2007), Mary Cross asserts that "the turmoil of new theory imported from Europe and the culture wars of ideology were bringing huge changes to the American academic world and the college curriculum. Whole departments devoted to popular culture and media studies emerged as well women's studies came into its own. And Madonna seemed to illustrate extremely well what was happening on the embattled cultural ramparts of late twentieth-century American. A perfect example of the whole theory of postmodernism the academic world was suddenly so immersed in".

According to professor Santiago Fouz-Hernández, author of Madonna's Drowned Worlds (2004), the abundance of critical work on the artist has almost certainly been part of broader developments in methodological trends in academia: the study of popular culture has come a long way since David Riesman described it in 1960 as "a relatively new field in American social science".

Spread

Madonna first came to prominence in the mid-1980s, and the discipline did not take long to start up. D Magazine talked about the Madonna scholarship in 1986. Robert Miklitsch, associate professor of Ohio University dates the start of Madonna studies to 1987 and Rocking Around The Clock: Music Television, Postmodernism & Consumer Culture by E. Ann Kaplan.

At this point, scholars like Kaplan and John Fiske represented Madonna to their academic audiences as a moment in which popular culture imitates critical theories of history, knowledge, and human identity. For them, Madonna quickly served "as a vehicle to open up issues", and she was placed at the center of the debate in the 20th century of high and popular culture. Various academics cited the point of view of Steven Anderson from The Village Voice (1989): "Madonna serves as the repository for our ideas about fame, money, sex, feminism, pop culture, even death". In numerous ways, Madonna was viewed as a multivalent figure, mainly areas of women's roles where the singer critiques and challenges widespread beliefs while at the same time reinforcing some of them.

From other reports, professor Michael Bérubé, asked why Madonna and not others acts (he cited Metallica, for instance). In his large explanation, Bérubé said partly because most citizens of advanced Western democracies tend to be more engaged by and informed about Madonna or blockbuster movies. Other author suggested that "pop culture and Madonna are central to political issues", as by this point in the academic rhetoric, Madonna emerges not simply as a pop star but as "the most significant artist of the late twentieth century". Anne Hull summarized that the singer come out as the "intrigue of academics, feminists, theologians, Marxists, sociologists, who want to take her apart and slide her under the microscope".

At the end, Pecknold wrote that "the fact that not only her work but her person was open to multiple interpretations contributed to the rise of Madonna studies".

Issues and approaches 

The Madonna studies is an interdisciplinary field of cultural studies, as well media and communication studies. Professors Andy Bennett (Griffith University) and Steve Waksman (Smith College), in the book The SAGE Handbook of Popular Music (2014) commented that "Madonna studies itself took a variety of forms (and not all of these necessarily counted as cultural studies)". Anne Hull writing for Tampa Bay Times described the Madonna studies as "highly specialized" field. Miklitsch called it, a "mini-discipline". For Susan McClary all of these studies on Madonna was from an iconographic perspective, and for author David Chaney, these academic writings are "explicitly concerned with interpreting the fabrication and representational strategies in the star's persona".

Professor Pamela Robertson Wojcik of University of Notre Dame noticed that "media attention fuels academic discourse, which in turn fuels media discourse, and ultimately all becomes a part of 'Madonna'". In this line, Hull mentioned that everything "is data". In a review from Dissertation Abstracts International: The humanities and social sciences. A (2008), it was written that the Madonna scholarship focused "solely" on identity politics through formalist readings of cultural texts and their reception to explore the influence of the larger political economic, historical, and cultural contexts of capitalist society.

Madonna studies explored a wide-ranging of scientific discourses. Cathy Schwichtenberg, a University of Georgia professor and editor of The Madonna Connection, asserts that served as a "touchstone for theoretical discussions" on issues of morality, sexuality, gender relations, gay politics, multiculturalism, feminism, race, racism, pornography, and capitalism to name a few. Authors of Encyclopedia of Women in Today's World, Volume 1 (2011) also added to the spectrum of topics the subcultural appropriation, politics of representation, consumer culture, the male gaze, body modification, reception studies, and postmodernism.

As with others observers, music professor Antoni Pizà Prohens also described the kindness of the academic writing discussed on Madonna, describing it as "a long and stretched et cetera". Among those topics, he added, globalization, immigrant rights, minority rights or sexual liberation. Another observer, Ricardo Baca added religion and spectacle. In addition, critic Daniel Harris, provides an overview of the academic reaction and approaches to Madonna studies arguing that "Madonna's work has spawned an entire industry of academic commentary" discussing her impact on music, feminism, sexuality, and dozens of more issues.

Her scholars also encompassed a broad spectrum of resources, including Madonna's work as her videos, performances, her music, films, interviews and so on. This usage was also known as a "texts" in the cultural studies branch. In Madonna's Drowned Worlds, authors stated that "this tendency to turn Madonna into a classroom aid becomes most obvious when one examines the basic methods by which her admirers interpret her songs and videos".

Illustrative examples of reference works

The Madonna studies saw its developments mostly at academic conferences, journals, courses, seminars, theses and books (including textbooks). The first scientific articles about Madonna appeared in 1985, only two years from her debut (1983) and experienced a boost in the early-1990s. According to academic Laurie Ouellette, Madonna scholars "have been leading classroom discussions and filling the pages of academic journals and textbooks since Madonna's early days as the Material Girl". Simon Frith, refers to this as the "boom in the academic Madonna business": "The books! the articles! the conferences! the courses".

Major American universities dedicated classes to the singer across the nation, mostly in the decades of the 1980s and 1990s. Probably more in the US than any other country, there were classes about Madonna. In this regard, Frenchman academic Georges-Claude Guilbert wrote in the book Madonna as Postmodern Myth (2002), Princeton, Harvard, UCLA, the University of Colorado and Rutgers were the first to propose courses "about" Madonna. Organizations like the set of liberal arts colleges 7 sisters teach courses that examine the influence of Madonna in culture. Professor Mathew Donahue lectures about Madonna in many of his classes at the Department of Popular Culture (the first Popular Culture department in the United States) of Bowling Green State University.

Worldwide, American editor Annalee Newitz commented that "Madonna occupies a definite place in the post-Western Cultures curriculum at universities everywhere". At the University of Amsterdam in the Netherlands, was created the elective academic discipline, Madonna: The Music and the Phenomenon, within the Department of Musicology. In Finland, Rossi Leena-Maija from Helsingin Sanomat informed in 1995 that Madonna became part of "Finnish academic life". Simon Reynolds mentioned the example of scholars from Frankfurt, and educator David Buckingham of the Cambridge campus. In 2015, a group of scholars dedicated a class to Madonna at the University of Oviedo, and marked the first time Oviedo devoted a course to a female singer.

Texts 
In Material Girls (1995), Suzanna Danuta Walters held these academic writings, has produced at least one major academic text devoted to Madonna. On the report of Eric Weisbard, only Madonna books proliferated in the 1990s (compared to her fellows Michael Jackson and Prince), and the bulk coming from a new group of cultural studies academics, mostly women. According to professor Sheila Jeffreys there exists "a slew of scholarly books in postmodern language" about her.

Professor Jane Desmond from University of Illinois Urbana-Champaign held that "the relevant bibliography is vast" in the Madonna studies, citing examples from Cathy Schwichtenberg (The Madonna Connection) to Lisa Frank and Paul Smith (Madonnarama) both from 1993. Another book from 1993 is Deconstructing Madonna (Fran Lloyd) that articulates Madonna in British rather than an American cultural perspective. Academics from Thomas Ferraro to Santiago Fouz-Hernández have identified others some core originating texts, like Karlene Faith's Madonna, Bawdy & Soul (1997) and the others previously mentioned by Desmond. For Fouz-Hernández, The Madonna Connection "was arguably a key event in the history of the relationship between the artist and the academy". Professor Pamela Robertson Wojcik also opined that the three of these books published in 1993, "cemented the institutionalization of a major subdivision of American media studies into Madonna studies".

Weisbard noticed that some bibliography on Madonna mixed music criticism with "academic chops" citing Madonna: Like an Icon by Lucy O'Brien as an example. In this hybrid critical-academic popular writing about Madonna, Fouz-Hernández also commented that her academic discourse is "periodically amalgamated in volumes such as Desesperately Seeking Madonna (Sexton, 1993), Madonna: The Rolling Stone Files (Rolling Stone, 1997) or The Madonna Companion (Metz and Benson, 1999)". To Ferraro, the last book has been "the better resource for Madonna criticism". Bitch She's Madonna, a book published in 2018 by a group of academics, was promoted as the first Spanish cultural book on Madonna, and as an extension of the Madonna studies in Spain. The same year, assistant professor Manav Ratti of Salisbury University, writing for Journal of American Studies wrote an essay about her book Sex and called it an extension of the "scholarship on Madonna". Some thesis garnered media exposition and citations, like Madonna's 'Like a Prayer:' A Critique of a Critique of the Geritol Generation of Chip Wells.

Madonna scholars
"Madonna scholars" was the name given to the academics working on Madonna, but other appellative was "Madonnologists". According to French academic Georges-Claude Guilbert, they worked mostly in areas of cultural theory, cultural studies, film, media studies, feminism, gender, gay and lesbianism, generally marked by left wing ideology, radical antiracism, extreme feminism, and lesbian or gay militancy.

In 1986, D Magazine staff discovered that "Dallas academics, have been among the nation's leaders in the newly born specialty of Madonna scholarship". In 1992, Barbara Stewart from Orlando Sentinel reported a "growing number of Madonna scholars" in the United States from professors of English, anthropology or communication. One of the earliest studiers of Madonna identified as "Madonna scholars" was John Fiske.

Opprobrium

Madonna scholars also received criticisms from both academy and mainstream media and some deemed them as a "marginal group". Ouellette traced the height of this criticism with the academic compendium The Madonna Connection "that such scholars became a fashionable target for "concern, condescension, and scorn from progressive quarters". By this point, whole articles dedicated to them was found in publications from The Nation to Inside Edition and Herald Tribune. A concern was that "these professors make Madonna the academic equivalent of Shakespeare". On the border of academic and public intellectual writing, bell hooks remained Madonna's most persuasive detractor.

Anne Hull ironically said: "A handful of renegade scholars—students and professors—are studying Madonna. While their colleagues explore gender conflicts in Florentine history or Aristotelian metaphysics, they search for higher meaning in Madonna". Hull further notes, "as one might imagine, Madonna scholars are a lonely posse in the high-brow, horn-rimmed world of academics". Spanish sociologist Enrique Gil Calvo from Complutense University of Madrid felt that "what scholars want is to take advantage of Madonna's fame". For Ouellette, "Madonna scholars are not so much interested in Madonna herself, but in the way they believe she shakes up traditional social roles and power hierarchies". Harris also expressed that "her academic admirers spend a great deal of time studying how she embodies the fantasies of other people; they devote remarkably little time, however, to discussing how she embodies their own".

Psychologist Abigail J. Stewart asked why many of her academic critics have chosen to look only at her triumphs and not at her pain. Stewart goes on to suggest that her academics have made of Madonna, a "solo generator of her image". But she problematizes that "these postmodernist have thus contributed at least as much as Madonna's biographers to her self-generated myth that she as individual is in control" citing Susan McClary whom claimed that Madonna is "solely responsible for creating her music, which is no the case eve for the two songs McClary analyzes". In this vein, numerous academics and feminists were accused of "enacting the wannabe syndrome of Madonna fans" according to Carla Freccero writing for Duke University Press. Unlike Stewart, Guilbert found that some "Madonnologists", "even seek to appropriate the Madonna text in order to serve an ideology, and reproach Madonna for her failures to promote this or that cause".

Defenses
As most of Madonna studiers were women, they managed to agree they were the subject of gender bias in academia. As they explained that these "derogatory criticisms" used by male reviewers were the same to describe Madonna that to describe them. At first instance, Laurie Schulze of University of Denver decries: "We're being treated as the 'sluts' of academia, in ways weirdly analogous to how Madonna herself is viewed". Furthermore, Schwichtenberg opined that "Madonna probably thinks we're stuffy people. But we don't think she'd say this isn't true".

E. Ann Kaplan, one of the precursors in the Madonna studies, was surprised and troubled in the backlash against Madonna scholars—which she felt is quite conservative—and said that emerged from a journal on the left. Kaplan believed it relates to the backlash against feminism at that time. As she asserted: "Madonna is a woman who has entered the public sphere as an entrepreneur earning a lot of money, something that is not considered natural for women. Sexually, she can be quite threatening for men [...] and this has made her a complicated, and highly contested phenomenon" while male music performers such as Elvis Presley, Michael Jackson and Prince "have gotten away" exploring that.

Chip Wells, another Madonna scholar that received attention from media, responded to critics from Inside Edition whom taped him saying: "I've read Aristotle, Plato, Descartes. And I'm not finding anything in them I'm not finding in Madonna". In defense, Wells commented "it's not hard to make us look dumb" adding that "what Inside Edition doesn't know is, Roman Hellenism was the pop culture of its time". At one moment, the network of Madonna scholars was described as "a tight unit". In this matters, Wells commented "by the nature of the area we are studying, we have to coalesce". However, others viewed this inter-exchanges, as "who swap bibliographies like 13-year-old girls trade earrings".

In response to the charges of fan-biased analysis, Lisa Henderson, an assistant professor said that "one can be a fan and a scholar, they enhance each other". Schulze, later dedicated an inspired-article for The Velvet Light Trap in 1999 where chronicles the controversy surrounding the Madonna studies and the tag they received as "Madonna's academic wannabes" by left-leaning popular press.

Reception

The Madonna studies divided the academic world. In this line, Spanish sociologist María Ángeles Durán held that Madonna has been the subject of numerous and diverse studies but "provoking a great controversy of opinions". Charles T. Banner-Haley, a professor of history at Colgate University also confirmed this, saying that "the academic world the force of Madonna has caused a division among scholars that has often gone from the sublime to the silly". For National Geographic Society it's a "controversial" area. For cultural critics on both the left and right, Madonna studies represented "the first and last word of barbarism", political barbarism for the left, cultural for the right.

The subject, Madonna, at the height of this debate was presented as a "talentless opportunist" or "a monster created by the publicity machine" by mainstream instructors, while academics in a populist view interpreted the singer as a "nothing less than a grass-roots revolutionary".

As a topic of wide media interest, the Répertoire International de Littérature Musicale observed the reception in the popular press noting "the ridicule that Madonna studies has provoked among journalists". Also, given the fact that Madonna's work only occupied consciousness for a mere years during the rise of this branch (1990s, and she debuted in 1983), Elizabeth Tippens of Rolling Stone in 1990, asked "it may be fair to ask, is it art yet? Do we wait another fifty years before we dare to deconstruct Madonna? To ask what she is teaching us about ourselves and our culture?". Another premier example of whole articles devoted to the branch from media, include the firm Knight Ridder, as they published a 1991 article on the subject titled "Madonna even controversial for scholars", citing comments from several teachers and other personalities. Professor Robert Miklitsch described the branch as a "political-cultural" phenomenon. Indeed, two "political" positions in particular were frequently attached to Madonna studies: pro-choice, and safe sex campaigns which encourage the use of condoms.

Madonna's responses
In 1994, Jon Pareles of The New York Times asked Madonna's thoughts about the academic discipline, and she answered "It's flattering because obviously I'm on a lot of people's minds". Years prior, in an interview with Vanity Fair according to Gary Goshgarian, she gave a similar answer: "It's flattering to me that people take the time to analyze me and that I've so infiltrated their psyches that they have to intellectualize my very being. I'd rather be on their minds than off". Madonna was quoted by scholar Frances Negrón-Muntaner saying: "Imagine for a second that you are Madonna... Imagine, that there are theory books about you, and that you are the main theme of dissertations and academic essays. Imagine that feminists discuss whether you are a heroine or a demon".

Criticisms

The Madonna studies generated a great amount of criticisms among scholars and others commentators. Internationally, it also raised disapproval and an editor commented that "was a laugh hear of Madonna studies" for many overseas. The charges against the studies were similar in many ways. Stephen Brown from University of Ulster commented that "when you read some of the stuff that academics have written about Madonna, then you're inclined to conclude that certain scholars should get out more".

The field was criticized because tends "to be jargon laden and prone to over-interpretation". A denunciation of the branch and its feminist and gay exponents in cultural studies, rails against "a state of intellectual anarchy that sanctions willfully perverse misreadings". Camille Paglia, called them as a "pretentious terminology" citing examples of words like "intertextual", "significations", "transgressive", "subversive" or "self-representation". She decries: "This would be comical, except for its ill effect on students and an increasingly corrupt career system".

Robert Christgau believes so much of the academic writing on Madonna feels translated. He also noticed that the "Madonnathinking" contrasted of her "overanalyzed" and "overstuffed" videos with her "underanalyzed" pop songs. Similar to Christgau, authors of Media and Cultural Theory (2010) found that the problem with Madonna studies from the perspective of Musicology is that "very little analysis is focused on the musical text but rather performances and promotional video". In this area, observer Andrew Blake provides a "musicological" critique, and also mentioned that cultural studies has a "problem" with music.
 
From an educational sense, some reviewers debated about whether Madonna should have a place in curriculums alongside more established and canonical subjects, while argued that she was an "unworthy of academic study" that "adds nothing to the advancement of knowledge". Various commentators described it as "a waste of time and money" for both professors and students. It has also been criticised for adding nothing to students' employment prospects. Another critic said that "neither this study theme sit well with some students of higher education". Roger Kimball, charged Madonna's presence in the classroom with nothing short of "defrauding students of a liberal-arts education". Ironically, Paglia (one of the earliest Madonna commentators) at that time said: "We do not need a whole course in Madonna".

Instructors like Robert Walser found that "students" reacted skeptical when it comes to Madonna, because "they haven't thought about in certain ways" and "they've trained not to image that there could be anything important going in popular culture, especially in popular culture produced by women". Many years after, Kathryn Murphy-Judy, an associate professor of French at Virginia Commonwealth University found the problem of outdated textbooks.

In the late-1990s, Australian feminist historian Barbara Caine dismissed the field saying: "While not advocating more Madonna studies (now considerably dated), nor defending them as either scholarly or political, I want to suggest that such studies of girl culture are important". In a similar treatment, American art historian Douglas Crimp said: "My hesitancy to participate in the Madonna studies phenomenon is that I generally think and write about things that really do matter to me, and Madonna doesn't matter to me that much". Robert Clay, a University of Florida English professor called them an "Old Hat".

Advocacy and counter-responses

Numerous academics, mainly Madonna studiers have defended the field. One of these justification was the importance of studying modern culture. Charles Sykes, of Milwaukee Magazine said that "there's no subject too ridiculous to be a subject of research in academics". Professor Thomas Ferraro at Duke University described the field as "quite academic in focus, language, and ideology". In 1997, in a conversation with The Wall Street Journal, Matt Wray asserted at that time the field is "past its prime now", but added respectfully, "a lot of good work was done on the significance of Madonna".

In the height of this debate, Jesse Nash, an anthropology professor at Loyola University, said, "it's more conventional to write Madonna off, to write popular culture off. But that's a big mistake. A whole generation is forming opinions based on her". To defenders like Schwichtenberg, "Madonna is a figure that is very important to subcultural groups[...] To say she doesn't deserve to be studied is very condescending to a lot of people". Also, historian Marilyn B. Young reminded that "pop culture has long been studied in universities" and "Madonna's impact is serious". Nash goes on to suggest that a figure like Madonna is "key to understanding the times in which they live and, by contrast, other eras".

Comparisons with historical figures and of previous eras was a constant. At first instance, some scholars say Madonna "is worthy of inquiry [today] as Charles Dickens was in the 18th century". Lisa Henderson, an assistant professor pondered that "a dissertation on Shakespeare might have been as laughable 300 years ago as a dissertation on Madonna might be today". Young also felt that to the generation coming up, "Madonna is more important than Leonard Bernstein".

Harvard University's Lynne Layton, also commented: "Teaching students how to read popular culture critically is as important as teaching them to read high art". Contrary to some student's concerns, Gary Burns and Elizabeth Kizer in Madonna: Like a Dichotomy (1990) found that "students in communication classes find it useful to study Madonna because she is a fascinating and prolific cultural figure". In a class devoted to Madonna in 2008, economist and academic Robert M. Grant commented that the "familiarity with Madonna means that it is possible for everyone to contribute to the discussion".

In regards the criticisms to the field and its authors, Ouellette suggested that "if critics had not been so hostile from the start, and had not spent so much time making scholarly work on Madonna seem ridiculous out of context, they might have been more fair in noting that the essays collected in the Madonna Collection, for instance, are nowhere near uniform celebrations of Madonna as a feminist or even populist idol".

Ambivalences
In the eyes of various observers, the Madonna studies has generated unexpected effects. At first instance and according to investigative journalist Ethan Brown, the Madonna studies "has obscured what made its subject so appealing in the first place (Madonna)" and blamed to Camilla Plagia to university semiotics departments. Following Brown's description, at the beginning of the 21st century, the flood of Madonna theories subsided for the first time. An author suggested that "a degree of saturation seems to have been reached". Professor Jim McGuigan of Loughborough University pointed out that in the cultural studies the case of Madonna has been so "overworked" that it has reached tedium, as happened in the old schools with the historical problem on the Causes of World War I.

More than one author suggested that Madonna studies is really not about Madonna, and it was motivated by professional factors within the academy; specifically, by many academics' desire to prove their social relevance. By this time, the growth of the Madonna Phenomenon (MP) reflected changes that were occurring in the perception of popular art, not only among academics but among mainstream pop critics as well. By this point, the MP was viewed as "the ultimate act of cultural imperialism".

CBS News president Fred W. Friendly was critical about the Madonna studies, but also suggested that "writing a major paper is supposed to be an intellectual achievement—a serious matter. Madonna is a media freak. How the media made her—I could see studying that". Another group have defended Madonna's own ambivalences in the perspective of academic writing, while Kaplan proposed that "she is nevertheless a contradictory and complex cultural phenomenon that cannot be simply dismissed". Like Kaplan, scholar Douglas Kellner agreed with this point, adding:

Comparisons
The field has been analogously used both to defend or criticize other academic trends, and subfields, mostly from the post-Madonna studies era. Danish professor Erik Steinskog, used the field to defend the courses proposed for Beyoncé. Historian professor David Roediger, noticed that in November 1997, The New York Times Magazine ridiculed whiteness studies and name it the silly successor to porn studies and Madonna studies. He also, pointed out: "The idea of studying the popularity of Madonna has been grist for the mills of many critics of trends in scholarship on American culture. No writer has more precisely described what is at stake in such studies than bell hooks".

Back in the 2000s, Michael Bérubé explained the related-critics and comparisons, saying that "as long as cultural studies is taken to be identical to Madonna Studies, the critiques of cultural studies follow an altogether predictable path". Writing for The Chronicle of Higher Education, Bérubé noticed that since the importation of cultural studies to the United States, the field "has basically turned into a branch of pop-culture criticism". In this vein, Stuart Hall, one of the most influential authors in the cultural studies, commented: "I really cannot read another cultural-studies analysis of Madonna or The Sopranos". According to American writer Julia Keller: "Madonna Studies 101 [is the] derisive nickname sometimes applied to cultural studies".

In Vamps & Tramps: New Essays (2011), Camille Paglia notated that the "current academic writing on Madonna" and indeed on American popular culture in general is of "deplorably low quality". It is marked by "inaccuracy, bathos, overinterpretation, overpoliticization and grotesquely inappropriate jargon borrowed from pseudotechnical semiotics and moribund French theory". Authors in Evaluating Creativity: Making and Learning by Young People (2000), commented that "whatever one's position on the Madonna debate, she stands as an image for a more general anxiety in the study of culture, and this respect the overall effect of postmodernism has been to unsettle criteria for evaluation in the arts in two ways: the neo-conservative backlash and cultural relativism".

Legacy
In Materialisations of a Woman Writer (2006), Swedish author Maria Wikse from Stockholm University observed that "Madonna is no longer in the academic limelight", but stated that "Madonna Studies remains an established field within Cultural Studies". Authors of Religion and Popular Culture: Rescripting the Sacred (2008), commented that "despite the (perhaps misguided)" mocking of the Madonna studies wave, "the period produced some important and groundbreaking work in cultural studies that focused on the music, videos [and] films".

For associate professor Diane Pecknold, the Madonna studies "heralded and hastened the development of American cultural studies". Dutch media scholar Jaap Kooijman, commented that before the Madonna studies, "most scholarly attention was paid to genres and artists that were not considered 'pop'", but she brought 'pop' to the foreground. On a broader scale, "courses offered at such universities as Harvard, Princeton, UCLA and the University of Colorado have been put forth on the premise that celebrities have social significance and are therefore important topics of study". Even, British author Emma Brockes called the "post-Madonna" studies era to those degree courses of cultural studies held by best universities, like when Harvard pioneered a study on the singer back in the early 1990s.

In Madonna's drowned worlds (2004), authors notated that "academic studies and college courses dealing with Madonna's work benefited from the aura of her celebrity through the mid-1990s". In the early 1990s, by the way, Maureen Orth pointed out that "perhaps it's not surprising that even academics are doing a brisk trade in Madonna-ology". And despite the negative comments, her scholars garnered several benefits, as they appeared on talk shows, gracing a score of national and international newspapers and magazines. Schwichtenberg, even asserts that "writing about Madonna and her cultural significance had produced connections with others outside academe that dissolved the boundaries between public and private, academic and popular, theory and practice". In 2001, Andrew Morton informed: "All those college lecturers endlessly debating her impact on racial and gender relations in post-modern society, are still, after twenty years, desperately seeking Madonna".

Impact on Madonna's career

As Madonna's influence on academic scholarship has not gone unnoticed, educator David Buckingham deemed it as "a meteoric rise to academic canonisation". According to Mary Cross, she become an "exalted star on the unlikely stage of academia".

In the height of her academic attention, the 1990s, professor Gregory Ulmer at University of Florida deemed her as "the most studied pop figure in universities". Elizabeth Tippens from Rolling Stone commented in 1992, that "no female pop-music figure has ever infiltrated the halls of academia as Madonna has". Andreas Häger from Åbo Akademi University cited Schwichtenberg: "Hardly any other popular artist has received as much attention from the scientific community as Madonna".

Madonna's semiotic and significance was dissected by her pundits each of whom had their own take on her role in society from all-topics discussed. In regard this, Daniel Harris of The Nation (1992) held that "there is a Madonna for virtually every theoretical stripe". He extended this idea citing the "Lacanian Madonna" in Marjorie Garber's review, the "Foucauldian Madonna" in Charles Wells's view, the "Baudrillardian Madonna" for Cathy Schwichtenberg, followed by the "Freudian Madonna" of Cindy Patton and the "Marxist Madonna" by associate professor Melanie Morton. Others authors such as Colombian writer José Yunis and Caroline von Lowtzow from Süddeutsche Zeitung have reprinted Harri's point of view. The latter author, also added that this even prompted a parody of these multiple interpretations: a "Postmodernism Generator". Lola Galán from El País noticed this point as well and mentioned those philosophers and writer "invoked" to discuss the "Madonna phenomenon" such as Barthes, Brecht or Kant. In this vein, Chilean literary critic Óscar Contardo suggested that the academic publications that had the singer as their focus, multiplied, breaking down the semiotics of "her image, her music, her media appearances, her staging, and her implicit and explicit messages". The critical studies of Madonna reveal her as a symbol, image, and brand to be a critical nexus for the exploration of contemporary attitudes.

Measurement of Madonna's academic literature

Across the decades, a group of critics have commented and "measured" the literature about her in the academic world. Author David Chaney commented that she "has generated an enormous academic and popular literature of explanation and comment". Professor Pamela Robertson Wojcik cited that "Madonna is as ubiquitous in academic discourse as she is in the popular media". José F. Blanco writing for the academic journal, The Journal of Popular Culture in 2015, stated that "it can be argued that Madonna is overexposed in academic research". A similar suggestion was made by Fouz-Hernández in Madonna's drowned worlds (2004), recalling that "scholarly interest has since continued unabated". Australian historians Robert Aldrich and Garry Wotherspoon called Madonna a "performer of inimitable ubiquity" as she "has saturated the pages of academic journals". In Fashion and Celebrity Culture (2013), Pamela Church Gibson wrote "since the 1980s, there has surely been enough written about Madonna to create a whole new sub-discipline within cultural studies".

In Gender and Popular Culture (2013), authors described Madonna as "a female performer who has provoked a great deal of response from cultural critics and academics" and "her presence has sparked a wealth of academic debate". Alina Simone, author of Madonnaland (2016), commented while she was working in her book: "I maintained hope of finding some tiny stone left unturned in the giant gravel pit of Madonna studies", but she encontered "there is no dearth of material about Madonna, but an overwhelming excess".

Notes

1. To avoid intertextuality cases, most texts have author's quote attribution.

See also
 Bibliography of works on Madonna
 Academese
 Academic writing

References

Bibliography
 
 
 
 
 
 
 
 

Studies
Media studies
Cultural studies
Academic scandals